Sean Keith Sherk (born August 5, 1973) is a retired American mixed martial artist and former UFC Lightweight Champion. Sherk competed in the Ultimate Fighting Championship and was one of the first combatants to have been a championship competitor in multiple weight divisions (having also competed for the UFC Welterweight Championship). He was the second UFC Lightweight Champion in the organization's history after Jens Pulver vacated his title five years earlier. Sherk also spent time competing in the Japan-based organizations, PRIDE Fighting Championships and Pancrase; going undefeated in both promotions. He holds one of the longest undefeated streaks in mixed martial arts history, with only four career losses, all to fellow-UFC Champions. Sherk announced his official retirement from mixed martial arts competition in September 2013 having last fought three years prior.

Recognized for his role in the resurgence of the UFC Lightweight division, Sherk became the first UFC Lightweight Champion since the division was re-introduced by the UFC in 2006. He successfully defended the UFC Lightweight Championship against Hermes Franca at UFC 73, after winning the title in a Fight of the Night award winning performance against Kenny Florian at UFC 64. Sherk is noted to have taken part in some of the most important fights in the UFC's lightweight division, where he is considered to be one of the greatest lightweight competitors of his era.

Martial arts background
Sherk was born on August 5, 1973, in St. Francis, Minnesota. Sherk began Wrestling and Weight Training at age seven. He continued to wrestle for eleven years, and in that time he Wrestled over 400 matches. After finding Greg Nelson's Minnesota Martial Arts Academy in 1994, Sherk began to practice Boxing, Shooto, and Muay Thai. In 1999, Sherk defeated Roscoe Ostyn by decision in his first MMA fight.

Mixed martial arts career
Sherk began his mixed martial arts career in 1999, where he went on an eight-fight win streak before signing with the Ultimate Fighting Championship (UFC) in 2001. Sherk fought only once before leaving the UFC. He returned in 2002 and fought Matt Hughes for the UFC Welterweight Championship in 2003. He lost the match and went on to sign with Pride Fighting Championships (Pride).

Ultimate Fighting Championship (2001–2003)
Sherk made his UFC debut at UFC 30, where he defeated Tiki Ghosn. After going 5–0–1 outside the UFC, he was brought back to fight Jutaro Nakao at UFC 36, a fight which Sherk won via unanimous decision. On September 27, 2002, at UFC 39,  Sherk defeated Benji Radach when the fight was stopped due to a cut Radach had received.

Sherk was then chosen to fight Matt Hughes for the UFC Welterweight Championship on April 25, 2003. Sherk lost the fight via unanimous decision after going five five-minute rounds. In a back and forth battle, Sherk won two of the overall five rounds, becoming the first and only fighter to ever fight a full five round fight with then-champion Matt Hughes.

Pride (2004)
Following his loss to Hughes, Sherk fought three more times in 2003, winning all three bouts. In 2004, he signed with Pride and made his debut with the Japanese-based organization at Pride Bushido 2. Sherk defeated Ryuki Ueyama via unanimous decision, in what was his only outing in the company.

According to Sherk's website, the Japanese fans are the ones responsible for giving him the nickname "The Muscle Shark."  While he was popular in Japan, Sherk found it difficult to travel and support his family and found he could make a better living fighting as a main event on local shows.  He also cited his lack of health insurance for making this decision.

Return to the UFC (2005–2010)

Sherk was invited back to the UFC in 2005 for a fight with Georges St. Pierre. Sherk lost by TKO, but was given another fight in the UFC at UFC 59, Sherk demonstrated that he was able to stand and strike with the more documented striker in Nick Diaz as well as mixing his combination very well with his takedowns, he defeated Nick Diaz via unanimous decision. During the post-fight interview, Sherk stated his intention to drop down in weight to the lightweight division.

In October 2006, at UFC 64, Sherk won all five rounds using his superior wrestling and ground and pound and defeated Kenny Florian via unanimous decision to win the UFC Lightweight Championship. With this win, Sherk became the first UFC Lightweight Champion  since Jens Pulver vacated the title in 2002. Sherk fought the bout with a torn rotator cuff and was forced to rehabilitate afterwards.

Steroid accusations

In July 2007, Sherk successfully defended his title against Hermes França at UFC 73. After the fight, the California State Athletic Commission (CSAC) announced that Sherk had tested positive for Nandrolone, a banned steroid, in a urine test the day prior to the fight. After testing positive for 12 ng/ml of Nandrolone, Sherk was fined $2,500 and suspended from competing in California for one year. Sherk's suspension was reduced to six months after appealing his allegations on December 4, 2007, making him eligible to fight in early January 2008. Sherk argued that errors were made in lab testing procedures. He asserted that the lab had failed to properly test the vials used in earlier, positive tests for any remaining steroid content, which may have resulted in his sample becoming contaminated. Quest Diagnostics and the CSAC denied any errors were made.
Following the CSAC's decision to uphold the results of the positive steroid test, the UFC officially stripped Sherk of his UFC Lightweight Championship. At UFC 80, B.J. Penn defeated Joe Stevenson to win the vacant title. After the fight, UFC president Dana White announced that Penn's first title defense would be against Sherk, who was reinstated by UFC in April 2008, and has tested clean ever since. Sherk and Penn fought at UFC 84 on May 24, 2008. Sherk lost by TKO in the third round after failing to answer the fourth round bell.

After UFC 84

Sherk fought Tyson Griffin at UFC 90: Silva vs Cote, in a fight with title contention implications. In a three-round war, Sherk won by unanimous decision, earning him Fight of the Night. In the first round Sherk was putting the pressure on Griffin from the very beginning scoring take-downs and taking Griffins back. Throughout the second and third rounds Sherk took Griffin down once more and the rest remained an exciting striking battle between the two. Sherk demonstrated very crisp and technical striking that night.

Sherk next fought Frankie Edgar at UFC 98 losing via unanimous decision. Sherk again found himself in trouble with an athletic commission post fight, after he ran from the arena while still in his fight shorts and no shirt before supplying a post fight urinalysis. He was contacted by commission officer Keith Kizer and told to return to the arena immediately or face his license being revoked. Sherk returned within the hour and provided a urinalysis and tested clean, but was still suspended 45 days for the actions.

Injury plague hits

Sherk was scheduled to face Gleison Tibau at UFC 104, but was forced off the card with an injury. He was replaced by Josh Neer.

Sherk was scheduled to face Rafaello Oliveira on January 2, 2010 at UFC 108. However, due to an injury to Tyson Griffin, Sherk was promoted to the main card to fight Jim Miller. Sherk did not compete at UFC 108, pulling out due to injury. Sherk suffered a cut above his right eye requiring several stitches.

Sherk was expected to face Clay Guida on March 21, 2010 at UFC on Versus: Vera vs. Jones, but Sherk was forced off the card with yet another injury.

Return to the Octagon and Retirement

After a 16-month hiatus, Sherk returned on September 25, 2010 at UFC 119 and defeated Evan Dunham via split decision in a bout that earned Fight of the Night honors.

Sherk was planning a fall 2011 return after rehabbing past injuries, but no fights for him came to fruition.

After rehabbing a litany of injuries over the past few years, Sherk indicated in October 2012 that he was still planning a return to the UFC and hoped to return sometime in early 2013.

On September 2, 2013, Sherk formally announced his retirement from MMA fighting.

On February 20, 2016, Sherk verbally expressed that he would end his retirement to fight Royce Gracie in Bellator. He declined any indication of a UFC return.

Personal life
Sherk and his wife Heather have two sons, Kyler and Tegan. Sherk has coached a team of fighters at the Minnesota Martial Arts Academy. He has also worked flipping houses in the Minnesota area.

Championships and accomplishments

Mixed martial arts
Ultimate Fighting Championship
UFC Lightweight Championship (One time)
One successful title defense
Fight of the Night (Three times) vs. Kenny Florian, Tyson Griffin, and Evan Dunham
PRIDE Fighting Championship
One of only two UFC Lightweight Champions to compete in PRIDE FC

Mixed martial arts record

|-
| Win
| align=center| 
| Evan Dunham
| Decision (split)
| UFC 119
| 
| align=center| 3
| align=center| 5:00
| Indianapolis, Indiana, United States
| 
|-
| Loss
| align=center| 35–4–1
| Frankie Edgar
| Decision (unanimous)
| UFC 98
| 
| align=center| 3
| align=center| 5:00
| Las Vegas, Nevada, United States
| 
|-
| Win
| align=center| 35–3–1
| Tyson Griffin
| Decision (unanimous)
| UFC 90
| 
| align=center| 3
| align=center| 5:00
| Rosemont, Illinois, United States
| 
|-
| Loss
| align=center| 34–3–1
| B.J. Penn
| TKO (flying knee and punches)
| UFC 84
| 
| align=center| 3
| align=center| 5:00
| Las Vegas, Nevada, United States
| 
|-
| Win
| align=center| 34–2–1
| Hermes França
| Decision (unanimous)
| UFC 73
| 
| align=center| 5
| align=center| 5:00
| Sacramento, California, United States
| 
|-
| Win
| align=center| 33–2–1
| Kenny Florian
| Decision (unanimous)
| UFC 64
| 
| align=center| 5
| align=center| 5:00
| Las Vegas, Nevada, United States
| 
|-
| Win
| align=center| 32–2–1
| Nick Diaz
| Decision (unanimous)
| UFC 59
| 
| align=center| 3
| align=center| 5:00
| Anaheim, California, United States
| 
|-
| Loss
| align=center| 31–2–1
| Georges St-Pierre
| TKO (punches and elbows)
| UFC 56
| 
| align=center| 2
| align=center| 2:53
| Las Vegas, Nevada, United States
| 
|-
| Win
| align=center| 31–1–1
| Joel Blanton
| Submission (rear-naked choke)
| BP: Pride and Glory
| 
| align=center| 1
| align=center| 2:02
| Georgia, United States
| 
|-
| Win
| align=center| 30–1–1
| Lee King
| Submission (arm-triangle choke)
| Extreme Challenge 60
| 
| align=center| 1
| align=center| 2:20
| Medina, Minnesota, United States
| 
|-
| Win
| align=center| 29–1–1
| Brodie Farber
| Submission (guillotine choke)
| SF 6: Battleground in Reno
| 
| align=center| 1
| align=center| 0:55
| Reno, Nevada, United States
| 
|-
| Win
| align=center| 28–1–1
| Darin Brudigan
| Submission (arm-triangle choke)
| Cage Fighting Xtreme 2
| 
| align=center| 1
| align=center| 1:30
| Brainerd, Minnesota, United States
| 
|-
| Win
| align=center| 27–1–1
| Gerald Strebendt
| TKO (punches)
| Extreme Challenge 58
| 
| align=center| 1
| align=center| 3:52
| Medina, Minnesota, United States
| 
|-
| Win
| align=center| 26–1–1
| Eric Heinz
| Submission (neck crank)
| Pride and Fury
| 
| align=center| 1
| align=center| 0:58
| Worley, Idaho, United States
| 
|-
| Win
| align=center| 25–1–1
| Jake Short
| Submission (rear-naked choke)
| ICC: Trials 2
| 
| align=center| 1
| align=center| 2:51
| Minnesota, United States
| 
|-
| Win
| align=center| 24–1–1
| Kaleo Padilla
| Submission (neck crank)
| You Think You're Tough
| 
| align=center| 2
| align=center| 1:17
| Kona, Hawaii, United States
| 
|-
| Win
| align=center| 23–1–1
| Ryuki Ueyama
| Decision (unanimous)
| Pride Bushido 2
| 
| align=center| 2
| align=center| 5:00
| Yokohama, Japan
| 
|-
| Win
| align=center| 22–1–1
| Charles Diaz
| Submission (americana)
| EP: XXXtreme Impact
| 
| align=center| 2
| align=center| 0:58
| Tijuana, Mexico
| 
|-
| Win
| align=center| 21–1–1
| Mark Long
| TKO (submission to punches)
| Extreme Combat
| 
| align=center| 1
| align=center| 0:42
| Fridley, Minnesota, United States
| 
|-
| Win
| align=center| 20–1–1
| John Alexander
| TKO (punches)
| Extreme Combat
| 
| align=center| 1
| align=center| 1:57
| Anoka, Minnesota, United States
| 
|-
| Loss
| align=center| 19–1–1
| Matt Hughes
| Decision (unanimous)
| UFC 42
| 
| align=center| 5
| align=center| 5:00
| Miami, Florida, United States
| 
|-
| Win
| align=center| 19–0–1
| John Alexander
| Submission (rear-naked choke)
| Extreme Combat 2
| 
| align=center| 1
| align=center| 1:28
| Minneapolis, Minnesota, United States
| 
|-
| Win
| align=center| 18–0–1
| Benji Radach
| TKO (doctor stoppage)
| UFC 39
| 
| align=center| 1
| align=center| 4:16
| Uncasville, Connecticut, United States
| 
|-
| Win
| align=center| 17–0–1
| Jutaro Nakao
| Decision (unanimous)
| UFC 36
| 
| align=center| 3
| align=center| 5:00
| Las Vegas, Nevada, United States
| 
|-
| Win
| align=center| 16–0–1
| Claudionor Fontinelle
| Submission (rear-naked choke)
| UCC 6: Redemption
| 
| align=center| 2
| align=center| 1:04
| Montreal, Quebec, Canada
| 
|-
| Draw
| align=center| 15–0–1
| Kiuma Kunioku
| Draw
| Pancrase - 2001 Neo-Blood Tournament Second Round
| 
| align=center| 3
| align=center| 5:00
| Tokyo, Japan
| 
|-
| Win
| align=center| 15–0
| Curtis Brigham
| TKO (retirement)
| UW: St. Paul
| 
| align=center| 3
| align=center| 1:15
| St. Paul, Minnesota, United States
| 
|-
| Win
| align=center| 14–0
| Jason Purcell
| TKO (punches)
| UW: Ultimate Fight Minnesota
| 
| align=center| 1
| align=center| 1:42
| Bloomington, Minnesota, United States
| 
|-
| Win
| align=center| 13–0
| Marty Armendarez
| TKO (punches)
| KOTC 8 - Bombs Away
| 
| align=center| 3
| align=center| 2:07
| Williams, California, United States
| 
|-
| Win
| align=center| 12–0
| Manny Gamburyan
| Decision (unanimous)
| Reality Submission Fighting 3
| 
| align=center| 1
| align=center| 18:00
| Belleville, Illinois, United States
| 
|-
| Win
| align=center| 11–0
| Tiki Ghosn
| TKO (shoulder injury)
| UFC 30
| 
| align=center| 2
| align=center| 4:47
| Atlantic City, New Jersey, United States
| 
|-
| Win
| align=center| 10–0
| Karo Parisyan
| TKO (corner stoppage)
| Reality Submission Fighting 2
| 
| align=center| 1
| align=center| 16:20
| Belleville, Illinois, United States
| 
|-
| Win
| align=center| 9–0
| Ken Parham
| Decision (unanimous)
| Submission Fighting Championships
| 
| align=center| 2
| align=center| 5:00
| Collinsville, Illinois, United States
| 
|-
| Win
| align=center| 8–0
| Karo Parisyan
| Decision (unanimous)
| Reality Submission Fighting 1
| 
| align=center| 1
| align=center| 18:00
| Belleville, Illinois, United States
| 
|-
| Win
| align=center| 7–0
| Steve Gomm
| Decision (split)
| Extreme Challenge 28
| 
| align=center| 1
| align=center| 10:00
| Ogden, Utah, United States
| 
|-
| Win
| align=center| 6–0
| Scott Bills
| Decision (unanimous)
| Extreme Challenge 28
| 
| align=center| 1
| align=center| 10:00
| Ogden, Utah, United States
| 
|-
| Win
| align=center| 5–0
| Kurtis Jensen
| TKO (punches)
| Extreme Challenge: Trials
| 
| align=center| 1
| align=center| 1:00
| Mason City, Iowa, United States
| 
|-
| Win
| align=center| 4–0
| Johnnie Holland
| Submission (americana)
| Ultimate Wrestling
| 
| align=center| 2
| align=center| 2:10
| Bloomington, Minnesota, United States
| 
|-
| Win
| align=center| 3–0
| Joe Paun
| Decision (unanimous)
| Midwest MMA Championship 1
| 
| align=center| 1
| align=center| 15:00
| Clinton, Iowa, United States
| 
|-
| Win
| align=center| 2–0
| Dean Kugler
| Decision (unanimous)
| Midwest MMA Championship 1
| 
| align=center| 1
| align=center| 10:00
| Clinton, Iowa, United States
| 
|-
| Win
| align=center| 1–0
| Roscoe Ostyn
| Decision (unanimous)
| Dangerzone: Mahnomen
| 
| align=center| 3
| align=center| 3:00
| Mahnomen, Minnesota, United States
|

References

External links
Official site

Official MySpage page

1973 births
Living people
People from St. Francis, Minnesota
American male mixed martial artists
Lightweight mixed martial artists
Welterweight mixed martial artists
Mixed martial artists utilizing boxing
Mixed martial artists utilizing Muay Thai
Mixed martial artists utilizing wrestling
Ultimate Fighting Championship champions
Ultimate Fighting Championship male fighters
American Muay Thai practitioners
American sportspeople in doping cases
Doping cases in mixed martial arts
Sportspeople from Minnesota
Mixed martial artists from Minnesota